The Leeds municipal elections were held on Thursday 7 May 1953, with one third of the council as well as a vacancy in Richmond Hill to be elected.

Winning control of Leeds was one of Labour's highlights in a night that seen them make gains across the country. Whilst there was a swing away from Labour to the Conservatives of over four percent from the previous year's high benchmark, Labour were able to repeat most of the gains they achieved the year before, with the two exceptions being Armley - a seat they already held - and Beeston, which the Tories managed to hold by sixty-six votes this time around. In total they gained seven seats, replacing the Tories slim majority of two with a majority of twelve. Turnout continued its trend downwards with a post-war low of 41.4%.

Election result

The result had the following consequences for the total number of seats on the council after the elections:

Ward results

References

1953 English local elections
1953
1950s in Leeds